The 1988 U.S. Women's Open was the 43rd U.S. Women's Open, held July 21–24 at the Five Farms East Course of Baltimore Country Club in Lutherville, Maryland, a suburb north of Baltimore.

Liselotte Neumann won her only major title, three strokes ahead of runner-up Patty Sheehan. From Sweden, she was only the fifth international player to win the U.S. Women's Open. For the first time, the championship was won by non-Americans in consecutive years, as Laura Davies of England won in 1987.

At age 22, Neumann was the youngest professional to date to win the title, second by two months to 1967 champion Catherine Lacoste, an amateur who won less than a week after turning 22. She opened with a record 67 on Thursday, and either led or co-led after every round.

Sixty years earlier, the East Course hosted the PGA Championship in 1928, won by Leo Diegel. He stopped four-time defending champion Walter Hagen in the quarterfinals, ending his winning streak at 22 matches.

Past champions in the field

Made the cut

Source:

Missed the cut

Source:

Round summaries

First round
Thursday, July 21, 1988

Source:

Second round
Friday, July 22, 1988

Source:

Third round
Saturday, July 23, 1988

Source:

Final round
Sunday, July 24, 1988

Source:

References

External links
U.S. Women's Open - past champions - 1988

U.S. Women's Open
Golf in Maryland
Sports competitions in Maryland
Lutherville, Maryland
Women's sports in Maryland
U.S. Women's Open
U.S. Women's Open
U.S. Women's Open
U.S. Women's Open